Spalangia cameroni is a species of parasitic wasp in the genus Spalangia that feeds on houseflies. It has a lifecycle of 21–28 days, and is used as a biological pest control.

References 

Pteromalidae
Biological pest control wasps